Liam Boothman (February 1939 – 26 July 2018), better known as Achille Boothman, was an Irish hurler who played as a right wing-forward for club sides St. Columba's and Crumlin and at inter-county level with the Dublin senior hurling team.

Playing career

Inter-county

After playing for the Dublin minor team for two unsuccessful seasons in 1956 and 1957, Boothman made his senior debut on 8 November 1959 in a National League defeat of recently crowned All-Ireland champions Waterford. Later that season he made his first championship start in a Leinster Championship semi-final draw with Wexford.

On 16 July 1961, Boothman was at right wing-forward when Dublin defeated Wexford by 7-05 to 4-08 to win the Leinster Championship. In the subsequent All-Ireland final on 3 September 1961, Boothman played in the same position against Tipperary. The game ended in chaos, with Dublin losing by a point.

Honours

Dublin
Leinster Senior Hurling Championship (1): 1961

Leinster
Railway Cup (1): 1962

References

1939 births
2018 deaths

Crumlin hurlers
Dublin inter-county hurlers